The Mayor of Cincinnati is recognised as the official head and representative of the city for all purposes. There have been seventy-six mayors of Cincinnati, the first of which being David Ziegler in 1802. The current mayor is Aftab Pureval, who was elected on November 2, 2021, and took office noon on January 4, 2022.

Executive powers
The mayor shall preside over all meetings of the Cincinnati City Council.  The mayor may call a special meeting of the council, but may not have a vote in the council. The mayor has the power to propose legislation for debate among the council. The mayor shall appoint and may remove the vice-mayor and the chair of all committees of the council without the advice and consent of the council.

The mayor of Cincinnati shall be recognized as the official head and representative of the city for all purposes, except as provided otherwise in the city charter of Cincinnati. The mayor may appoint a city manager upon an affirmative vote of five members of the city council following the mayor's recommendation.

The mayor delivers an annual address to the council and citizens of the city reporting on the state of the city and making recommendations for the establishment and achievement of future city goals.

In time of public danger or emergency, the mayor, with the consent of the council, may take command of the police, maintain order and enforce the law.

Succession
In the event of the death, removal or resignation of the mayor, the Vice Mayor of Cincinnati shall succeed to the office of mayor in accordance with the city charter. The current vice mayor of Cincinnati is Jan Michelle Kearney.

History
Until the charter of 1815, the President of the council served as equivalent of mayor. Two sources agree on the list of Presidents:

Prior to 1925 (and since 1999) the mayor of Cincinnati, Ohio was elected in a separate, partisan election.

In 1924, the Charter Party, a local third-party, was founded. It has elected members of the city council and mayors. Until 1961, many Democrats ran as Charterites. The party focuses exclusively on local government; thus, many Charterites switch to a major party when seeking office outside Cincinnati.

From 1925 through 1998, the mayor was chosen by the city council from among its nine members.

In 1971, a coalition of two parties, the Democrats and the Charterites, worked out a power-sharing plan, which, starting in 1973, resulted in a rotating mayorship. After a few years of rotation, they decided that the city council member who received the most votes in the election would automatically become mayor.

In 1999, Charlie Luken became the first mayor to take office under a restored system of direct mayoral election.

Mayor firsts
In 1900, Julius Fleischmann became the youngest mayor of Cincinnati at the age of 28 years.

In 1954, Dorothy N. Dolbey became the first female mayor of the City of Cincinnati.

In 2006, Mark Mallory was the first directly elected  African-American Mayor of Cincinnati.

On November 2, 2021, Mayor Pureval was elected the first Asian American mayor of Cincinnati. Mayor Pureval is the 70th and current mayor of Cincinnati.

List of mayors

See also
 Election Results, Mayor of Cincinnati, Ohio
 Election Results, City Council of Cincinnati, Ohio
 Timeline of Cincinnati

References

Cincinnati
 
Mayors